H29 may refer to:
 Hanriot H.29
 HMS H29, a 1917 British H class submarine
 HMS Thanet (H29)
 McDonnell H-29, an experimental ramjet-rotor powered helicopter